The Housing Authority of the City of Pittsburgh (HACP) was created in 1937  under the U.S. Housing Act of 1937 to establish public housing within the city limits. HACP was the first housing authority in the Commonwealth of Pennsylvania and one of the first in the United States.

History
 Bedford Dwellings was the authority's first Housing Project, approved by President Franklin D. Roosevelt in 1938
 Scattered Sites were established in the late 1960s, creating culturally diverse housing locations within the city's neighborhoods.
 The authority's security force, later becoming an official police department, was established in 1974, after an extremely high increase of crime at the authority's Housing sites
 In the 1980s two closed city schools were refurbished into senior housing.

Housing sites
HACP operates  seven Family Communities as well as eleven Senior/Disabled/High Rise Communities. Also the authority oversees eight privately managed  communities throughout the city.

Family communities

Senior/disabled communities

Privately managed communities

American Recovery and Reinvestment Act of 2009
In 2009, as part of the American and Reinvestment Act, HACP received $27 million in the form of a Recovery Act Public Housing Capital Fund Formula Grant as well as created 107 Jobs. $21 million of these funds were used to make units up to code with the Uniform Federal Accessibility Standards (UFAS). The other projects used with ARARA Funding, included:
 An authority physical needs assessment ($170,000)
 Replacement of the Fire Alarm System at Bedford Dwellings ($1 Million)
 Acquisition of Scattered Sites and Accessible Homes ($2.6 Million)
 Roof Replacements at Addison Hall and Northview Heights High Rise ($618,000)
 Renovation to the elevators at Gualtieri Manor ($152,000)
 administrative costs: ($1.2 Million)

See also
 List of public housing authorities in Pennsylvania
 List of municipal authorities in Allegheny County, Pennsylvania

References

Organizations based in Pittsburgh
Public housing in Pennsylvania
Government of Pittsburgh